Anett Kontaveit was the defending champion, but chose not to participate.

Alison Riske won the title, defeating Tara Moore in the final, 4–6, 7–6(7–5), 6–3.

Seeds

Main draw

Finals

Top half

Bottom half

References 
 Main draw

Aegon Eastbourne Trophy - Singles
Aegon Eastbourne Trophy
2016 in English tennis